Erica Sjöström, born 30 June 1970 in Tierp, Sweden, is a Swedish female singer and saxophonist. Since 1999. she has been the singer in Swedish band the Drifters.

She began her career in 1992 in the part-time band Manges orkester from Tierp. Manges participated at Svenska dansbandsmästerskapen in 1994 and 1996, reaching the finals.

In 1999, she won the "Sångmicken" contest in Ekebo. She has been awarded five Guldklaven awards in Malung, personal as "wind musician of the year" and "singer of the year", and together with the other bandmembers of the Drifters in the categories "band of the year" and "song of the year".

In 2010, she could also be heard performing a duet with Scotts recording the song "In a Moment Like This".

References 

1970 births
Dansband singers
Living people
People from Tierp Municipality
Swedish saxophonists
Women saxophonists
21st-century saxophonists
21st-century women musicians
21st-century Swedish singers
21st-century Swedish women singers